Emirates 24/7, stylised as Emirates 24|7, is a Dubai Media Incorporated news website and television news programme, respectively. The televised news programme, Emirates 24/7, is a 30-minute segment broadcast weekly on Dubai Media Inc.'s television channel Dubai One, presenting news and business stories of the week and UAE viewers' reactions.

Website

TV programme
The programme Emirates 24/7 was launched in early 2010, originally hosted by Rebecca McLaughlin. Katie Jensen became the programme's Presenter in November 2010. In its first season, Emirates 24/7 interviewed guests including Emirates Airlines’ Sheikh Ahmed bin Saeed Al Maktoum, the Al Jaber Group’s Fatima Al Jaber, the IMF’s John Lipsky, the British Consul-General to the UAE Guy Warrington and Hollywood actor Colin Firth.

Emirates 24/7 was relaunched for its second season on 18 January 2011, becoming a weekly one-hour programme covering news, current affairs, business, sport and entertainment. Its slogan was "People, culture, trends, ideas, lifestyle: if it makes a difference to your life, Emirates 24/7 will tell you why."

The programme is presented by Katie Fielder and former World of Sports presenter Omar Butti. Additional reports are provided by Priyanka Dutt. It is filmed at Dubai Media Incorporated’s studios.

References

External links
 

2010 Emirati television series debuts
Dubai One original programming
2010s Emirati television series